The Tony Award for Best Direction of a Play has been given since 1960.  Before 1960 there was only one award for both play direction and musical direction, then in 1960 the award was split into two categories: Dramatic and Musical.  In 1976 the Dramatic category was renamed to Play.  For pre-1960 direction awards please reference Tony Award for Best Director.

Winners and nominees

1960s

1970s

1980s

1990s

2000s

2010s

2020s

Award records

Multiple wins
 6 Wins
 Mike Nichols

 3 Wins
 Jerry Zaks

 2 Wins
 Peter Brook
 Stephen Daldry
 John Dexter
 Marianne Elliott
 Gerald Gutierrez
 Peter Hall
 Sam Mendes
 Jack O'Brien
 Gene Saks

Multiple nominations

 10 Nominations
 Mike Nichols

 8 Nominations
 Peter Hall
 Daniel J. Sullivan

 6 Nominations
 George C. Wolfe

 5 Nominations
 Joe Mantello
 Marshall W. Mason
 Lloyd Richards
 Alan Schneider
 Bartlett Sher
 Matthew Warchus

 4 Nominations
 Michael Blakemore
 David Leveaux
 Gregory Mosher
 Jack O'Brien
 Gene Saks

 3 Nominations
 Stephen Daldry
 Gordon Davidson
 Howard Davies
 John Dexter
 Marianne Elliott
 Michael Grandage
 Gerald Gutierrez
 Kenny Leon
 Trevor Nunn
 José Quintero
 Jerry Zaks

 2 Nominations
 Joseph Anthony
 A. J. Antoon
 Melvin Bernhardt
 Peter Brook
 Arvin Brown
 John Caird
 Scott Ellis
 Richard Eyre
 Robert Falls
 Athol Fugard
 John Gielgud
 Rupert Goold
 Ulu Grosbard
 Tyrone Guthrie
 Joseph Hardy
 Ivo van Hove
 Doug Hughes
 Garry Hynes
 Nicholas Hytner
 Pam MacKinnon
 Sam Mendes
 Robert Moore
 Arthur Penn
 Stephen Porter
 Ellis Rabb
 Anna D. Shapiro
 John Tiffany
 Clifford Williams
 Noel Willman

Female winners

Only 6 women have won this award:

 Garry Hynes – The Beauty Queen of Leenane (1998)
 Mary Zimmerman – Metamorphoses (2002)
 Anna D. Shapiro – August: Osage County (2008)
 Pam MacKinnon – Who's Afraid of Virginia Woolf? revival (2013)
 Marianne Elliott – War Horse (2011) (shared with Tom Morris) and The Curious Incident of the Dog in the Night-Time (2015), making her the only woman to win this award more than once
 Rebecca Taichman – Indecent (2017)

See also
 Tony Award for Best Direction of a Musical
 Drama Desk Award for Outstanding Director of a Play
 Laurence Olivier Award for Best Director

References

External links
 Tony Award for Direction of a Play ibdb
 Tony Awards official site

Tony Awards
Awards established in 1960
1960 establishments in the United States